Jovan Kostovski  (born 19 April 1987) is a Macedonian footballer who is currently unemployed after most recently playing as a striker for Ethnikos Achna.

International career
He made his senior debut for Macedonia in a December 2012 friendly match against Poland and has earned a total of 13 caps, scoring 2 goals. His final international was a March 2016 friendly against Bulgaria.

International goals

Scores and results list Macedonia's goal tally first.

Achievements
FK Vardar
First Macedonian Football League: 2
Winner: 2011–12, 2012–13
Macedonian Cup: 1
Winner: 2006–07

References

External links
 
 Profile at MacedonianFootball 

1987 births
Living people
Footballers from Skopje
Association football forwards
Macedonian footballers
North Macedonia youth international footballers
North Macedonia under-21 international footballers
North Macedonia international footballers
FK Vardar players
OFI Crete F.C. players
FK Metalurg Skopje players
Orduspor footballers
Oud-Heverlee Leuven players
Ethnikos Achna FC players
Macedonian First Football League players
Super League Greece players
TFF First League players
Belgian Pro League players
Challenger Pro League players
Cypriot First Division players
Macedonian expatriate footballers
Expatriate footballers in Greece
Macedonian expatriate sportspeople in Greece
Expatriate footballers in Turkey
Macedonian expatriate sportspeople in Turkey
Expatriate footballers in Belgium
Macedonian expatriate sportspeople in Belgium
Expatriate footballers in Cyprus
Macedonian expatriate sportspeople in Cyprus